The 2018 Nottingham Open (also known as the Nature Valley Open for sponsorship purposes) was a professional tennis tournament played on outdoor grass courts. It was the 11th edition of the event for women and the 23rd edition for men. It was classified as a WTA International tournament on the 2018 WTA Tour for the women, and as an ATP Challenger Tour event for the men. The event took place at the Nottingham Tennis Centre in Nottingham, United Kingdom from 11 through 17 June 2018.

ATP singles main-draw entrants

Seeds

 1 Rankings are as of 28 May 2018.

Other entrants
The following players received wildcards into the main draw:
  Jay Clarke
  George Loffhagen
  Alexander Ward
  James Ward

The following players received entry into the singles main draw as special exempts:
  Alex de Minaur
  Dan Evans

The following player received entry into the singles main draw using a protected ranking:
  Jürgen Melzer

The following players received entry from the qualifying draw:
  Tobias Kamke
  Frederik Nielsen
  Brayden Schnur
  Tobias Simon

The following players received entry as lucky losers:
  Christopher Eubanks
  Dominik Köpfer

WTA singles main-draw entrants

Seeds

 1 Rankings are as of 28 May 2018.

Other entrants
The following players received wildcards into the main draw:
  Katie Boulter
  Samantha Stosur
  Gabriella Taylor

The following players received entry from the qualifying draw:
  Irina Falconi
  Danielle Lao
  Elena-Gabriela Ruse
  Valeria Savinykh
  Katie Swan
  Zheng Saisai

Withdrawals
Before the tournament
  Catherine Bellis → replaced by  Kurumi Nara
  Ana Bogdan → replaced by  Duan Yingying
  Madison Brengle → replaced by  Dalila Jakupović
  Christina McHale → replaced by  Vera Lapko
  Monica Niculescu → replaced by  Kristie Ahn
  Monica Puig → replaced by  Denisa Allertová
  Maria Sakkari → replaced by  Arina Rodionova

Retirements
  Zarina Diyas

WTA doubles main-draw entrants

Seeds

1 Rankings are as of 28 May 2018.

Other entrants
The following pair received a wildcard into the doubles main draw:
  Katie Boulter /  Katie Swan

Withdrawals
During the tournament
  Zarina Diyas
  Donna Vekić

Champions

Men's singles

  Alex de Minaur def.  Dan Evans 7–6(7–4), 7–5.

Women's singles

  Ashleigh Barty def.  Johanna Konta, 6–3, 3–6, 6–4

Men's doubles

  Frederik Nielsen /  Joe Salisbury def.  Austin Krajicek /  Jeevan Nedunchezhiyan 7–6(7–5), 6–1.

Women's doubles

  Alicja Rosolska /  Abigail Spears def.  Mihaela Buzărnescu /  Heather Watson, 6–3, 7–6(7–5)

References

External links
 Website

2018 WTA Tour
2018 ATP Challenger Tour
2018
2018 in English tennis
June 2018 sports events in the United Kingdom
2018 Nottingham Open